The 2015 Navy Midshipmen football team represented the United States Naval Academy in the 2015 NCAA Division I FBS football season. The Midshipmen were led by eighth-year head coach Ken Niumatalolo and played their home games at Navy–Marine Corps Memorial Stadium. The Midshipmen competed as a member of the Western Division of the American Athletic Conference, and were first year members of the conference. In their entire football history, this was the first season that Navy did not compete as an Independent. They finished the season 11–2, 7–1 in American Athletic play to finish in a tie for the Western Division title with Houston. However, due to their head-to-head loss to Houston, they did not represent the Western Division in the American Championship. They were invited to the Military Bowl where they defeated Pittsburgh.

Before the season

Previous season
The Navy Midshipmen began the 2014 season with a loss over #6 ranked Ohio State, but won two in a row defeating Temple and Texas State. However, they suffered three consecutive losses to Rutgers and Western Kentucky, along with rival Air Force. They rebounded by beating VMI and San Jose State, before falling to #10 ranked rival Notre Dame. Navy ended their season with three victories over Georgia Southern, South Alabama, and military rival Army in the 115th Army–Navy Game, their 13th consecutive victory over Army. The Midshipmen finished the regular season with a 7–5 record. This earned the Midshipmen an invitation to the 2014 Poinsettia Bowl, their 11th bowl game in a row, in which they beat the 7–5 San Diego State Aztecs 17–16.

Spring practices
Navy held spring practices during March and April 2015.

Schedule

Rankings

Note: Navy is ranked for the first time since their 2004 season. (Ranked 24 in AP poll)

The Midshipmen have been nationally ranked for four consecutive weeks, making it the first time this has happened since 1978.

Roster

Depth chart
The following players comprised the team's Depth chart prior to the 2014 Poinsettia Bowl:

Game Summaries

Colgate

East Carolina

at UConn

Air Force

at Notre Dame

Tulane

South Florida

at Memphis

SMU

On Senior Day, Navy quarterback Keenan Reynolds reached the end zone for the 78th time to set the NCAA record for career rushing touchdowns, surpassing University of Wisconsin's Montee Ball who amassed 77 touchdowns during the 2009–2012 seasons. Number 78 came quickly on a 4-yard run on Navy's opening drive. Reynolds then scored three more rushing touchdowns to boost his career total to 81, leading his #20 ranked team past SMU. The Midshipmen racked up 403 yards rushing, reaching a season high in total points. With this win, they also remain undefeated in the American Athletic Conference (ACC).

at Tulsa

The Navy offense racked up a total of 512 yards on the ground, while quarterback Keenan Reynolds ran for 81 yards with a rushing touchdown in the Midshipmen win over Tulsa with a score of 44-21. Reynolds also threw for a touchdown to become Navy's all-time leading rusher with 4,195 yards, breaking fellow Midshipmen Napoleon McCallum's record of 4,179 yards.

at Houston

Despite the American Athletic Conference west division title loss, Navy Midshipmen quarterback and Heisman Trophy contender Keenan Reynolds tied the Navy record for passing touchdowns with 29. Reynolds also tied Wisconsin's Montee Ball for the most touchdowns with 83 in FBS history.

vs. Army

vs. Pittsburgh (Military Bowl)

With this win, the Midshipmen ended the season 11-2, the first time in 135 years of school football history. Senior quarterback Keenan Reynolds scored four touchdowns: one touchdown pass and three rushing, becoming the NCAA career leader with 88 touchdowns and scoring a total of 530 points. Meanwhile, senior fullback Chris Swain rushed for a career 1,000 yards. The senior class picked up their 36th win, which tied the Midshipmen class of 1909.

References

Navy
Navy Midshipmen football seasons
Lambert-Meadowlands Trophy seasons
Military Bowl champion seasons
Navy Midshipmen football